Max Fischer may refer to:

 Max Fischer (art collector) (1886–1975), German art collector
 Max Fischer (politician) (1927–2015), German politician, representative of the Christian Social Union of Bavaria
 Max Fischer (screenwriter), writer and director of The Lucky Star
 Max Fischer, the main character in the 1998 film Rushmore

See also
 Max Fisher (1908 – 2005), an American businessman and philanthropist.
 Max Fisher, an American journalist and columnist.